Philip F. Tyler (15 January 1957 – 23 November 1988) was an Irish actor and television presenter.

Background
Tyler, who was born in Dublin, attended St Benildus College, where he starred in the school's first stage play. He completed his Leaving Certificate in 1974.

Career
Tyler was known for his work as a presenter on the popular Irish children's television show Bosco. He also featured in the 1980 BAC Films movie Criminal Conversation alongside Deirdre Donnelly, Peter Caffrey, and Glenroe's Emmet Bergin.

Tyler was active in the Hirschfeld Centre, Dublin's first LGBT community centre. He was involved in theatre shows with prominent gay rights activists such as David Norris and Tonie Walsh.

Personal life
Tyler died suddenly in London, England, on 23 November 1988. He was 31 years old. He was cremated in London on 29 November 1988.

Filmography
Bosco (1979-1982) - presenter
Lug na Locha (1981) - Lug
Thursday Play Date (1980) - Fergus
Criminal Conversation (1980) - Lynch

References

External links
 

1957 births
1988 deaths
Irish male television actors
Irish LGBT actors
People from Dublin (city)
RTÉ people